Dharapadavedu is a locality and zone headquarters (katpadi) in Vellore Municipal Corporation in the state of Tamil Nadu, India. Vellore-Katpadi Railway junction is located here. It is also a part of Katpadi locality. But Vellore corporation zonal office (zone-1) is located here.

Demographics

 India census, Dharapadavedu had a population of 30,238. Males constitute 50% of the population and females 50%. Dharapadavedu has an average literacy rate of 79%, higher than the national average of 59.5%: male literacy is 85% and, female literacy is 74%. In Dharapadavedu, 9% of the population is under 6 years of age. As per the religious census of 2011, Dharapadavedu had 83.61% Hindus, 5.23% Muslims, 10.52% Christians, 0.02% Sikhs, 0.05% Buddhists, 0.15% Jains, 0.42% following other religions and 0.% following no religion or did not indicate any religious preference.

References

Vellore
Neighbourhoods in Vellore